H06 is a regional road (H-Highway) in Crimea and Sevastopol. It runs northeast-south-southwest and connects Simferopol with Sevastopol. Since the 2014 annexation of Crimea by the Russian Federation, the route was given another code 35P-001 and 67P-1 (within Sevastopol).

Main route

Main route and connections to/intersections with other highways in Ukraine.

See also

 Roads in Ukraine

References

External links
Regional Roads in Ukraine in Russian

Roads in Crimea
Roads in Sevastopol